Keyboard, Oh Lord! Why Don't We? is the third album by Norwegian stoner rock band Thulsa Doom. The title is a quote from the Paul McCartney and Stevie Wonder hit single Ebony and Ivory. Since the last album, lead singer Papa Doom has left the band, and guitarist Doom Perignon has become the lead singer.

The album has received good reviews in the Norwegian press.

Track listing
 "Papa Was"
 "Need the Air"
 "Stay OK"
 "Raisins and Grapes"
 "Tears in the Morning"
 "The Deep of the City"
 "Be Forewarned"
 "The Ballad of Me and Fast Winston Doom"
 "Mr. Slow"
 "Keyboard, Oh Lord! Why Don't We?"

Thulsa Doom (band) albums
2005 albums